Ian Cooper (born 21 September 1946) is an English retired footballer who played professionally for Bradford City between 1965 and 1977, making nearly 450 appearances for the club. He went on to spend three seasons with Guiseley. He was born in Bradford.

References

1946 births
Living people
English footballers
Association football defenders
Bradford City A.F.C. players
Guiseley A.F.C. players
English Football League players
English football managers
Worcester City F.C. managers
Footballers from Bradford